The Russia Journal is a Russian English-language website, which is no longer updated.

History and profile
The Russia Journal was founded in 1998 by Indian-born entrepreneur  Ajay Goyal, who served as publisher and chief editor. The magazine was published weekly in the early 2000s in Moscow and Washington. The monthly print magazine version ended in 2005. Its online activity continued until 2007 before it stopped offering new information. The Russia Journal published business news, analysis, commentary and information from Russia. The website offers an archive of its online version from 1999–2005.

Goyal´s book „Uncovering Russia” published some materials from the magazine.

Content 
The magazine was the first to publish Russian columnists from left and right in English language. Several of the staunchest early critics of Vladimir Putin including Andrei Piontkowski, Elene Rykovtseva, Otto Latsis, Alexander Goltz were regular contributors to The Russia Journal. The editorial line of the newspaper was anti-oligarch.

References

External links
 The Russia Journal News
 "The Russia Journal Magazine" 

1998 establishments in Russia
2005 disestablishments in Russia
Defunct magazines published in Russia
Magazines established in 1998
Magazines disestablished in 2005
Monthly magazines published in Russia
News magazines published in Russia
Russian news websites
Weekly magazines published in Russia
Online magazines with defunct print editions